Solomon Soosaipillai Cyril is a Sri Lankan Tamil politician and former Member of Parliament.

Political career
At the April 2004 parliamentary election Cyril was a candidate in Jaffna District but failed to get elected. However, Cyril entered Parliament in April 2008 following the murder of K. Sivanesan MP in March 2008.

Cyril was not selected as a Tamil National Alliance candidate for the April 2010 parliamentary election.

References

1942 births
Living people
Members of the 13th Parliament of Sri Lanka
Sri Lankan Roman Catholics
Sri Lankan Tamil politicians
Tamil National Alliance politicians
Place of birth missing (living people)